6181 Bobweber, provisional designation , is a stony asteroid from the inner regions of the asteroid belt, approximately 5 kilometers in diameter. It was discovered on 6 September 1986, by American astronomer Eleanor Helin at the U.S. Palomar Observatory in California, and named after astronomer Robert Weber.

Orbit and classification 

The S-type asteroid orbits the Sun in the inner main-belt at a distance of 1.9–3.0 AU once every 3 years and 9 months (1,384 days). Its orbit has an eccentricity of 0.24 and an inclination of 8° with respect to the ecliptic. The first precovery was taken at the discovering observatory in 1954, which extended the asteroid's observation arc by 32 years prior to its discovery observation.

Physical characteristics

Rotation period 

A rotational lightcurve of Bobweber was obtained from photometric observations by Czech astronomer Petr Pravec at Ondřejov Observatory in December 2009. It gave a well-defined rotation period of  hours with a brightness variation of 0.12 in magnitude. In January 2014, astronomer Julian Oey at the Australian Blue Mountains Observatory obtained a nearly identical period of  hours with an amplitude of 0.15 magnitude.

Diameter and albedo 
According to the surveys carried out by NASA's Wide-field Infrared Survey Explorer with its subsequent NEOWISE mission, Bobweber measures 4.5 kilometers in diameter and its surface has a high albedo of 0.42 and 0.43, respectively, while the Collaborative Asteroid Lightcurve Link assumes a standard albedo for stony asteroids of 0.20 and calculates a diameter of 5.7 kilometers.

Naming 

This minor planet was named in memory of Robert Weber (1926–2008), physicist and discoverer of minor planets at MIT Lincoln Laboratory, developer of the Deep Space Satellite Tracking Network. He also co-developed and was credited with the first discoveries made by the Lincoln Near-Earth Asteroid Research (LINEAR) at Lincoln Laboratory's Experimental Test Site at White Sands Missile Range in Socorro, New Mexico. The approved naming citation was published by the Minor Planet Center on 21 March 2008.

Notes

References

External links 
 Asteroid Lightcurve Database (LCDB), query form (info )
 Dictionary of Minor Planet Names, Google books
 Asteroids and comets rotation curves, CdR – Observatoire de Genève, Raoul Behrend
 Discovery Circumstances: Numbered Minor Planets (5001)-(10000) – Minor Planet Center
 
 
 

006181
Discoveries by Eleanor F. Helin
Named minor planets
19860906